Thomas E. Dewberry (born April 29, 1951) is an American politician and judge from Maryland. He served as a member of the Maryland House of Delegates, representing District 12 from 1990 to 1994 and District 43B from 1995 to 2002.

Early life
Thomas E. Dewberry was born on April 29, 1951, in Baltimore, Maryland, to Frederick L. Dewberry. His father was Baltimore County Executive and deputy director of the Maryland Department of Transportation. He attended Loyola High School. Dewberry graduated from the University of Maryland, Baltimore County, in 1973 with a Bachelor of Arts in history. He graduated from the University of Baltimore School of Law in 1977 with a Juris Doctor. He was admitted to the bar in Maryland.

Career
Dewberry worked as a lawyer. He was treasurer of the National Conference of Regulatory Attorneys Convention in 1988.

Dewberry was a Democrat. In 1988, Dewberry was a delegate to the 1988 Democratic National Convention. He was appointed as a member of the Maryland House of Delegates, representing District 12, in 1990. He represented District 12 from 1990 until 1994. He represented District 43B in the Maryland House of Delegates from 1995 until his resignation on May 22, 2002. He was succeeded by John F. Quirk. He served as speaker pro tempore from 1997 to 2002.

In 2002, Dewberry became the chief administrative law judge of the Office of Administrative Hearings. He served in that role until 2019.

Dewberry served as president and is a member of the board of directors of Revisions, Inc., a psychosocial rehabilitation center. He serves on the board of directors of Historical Old Salem, Inc. He is a member of the Catonsville Chamber of Commerce.

Personal life
Dewberry is married and has two children.

References

Living people
1951 births
Politicians from Baltimore
University of Maryland, Baltimore County alumni
University of Baltimore School of Law alumni
Democratic Party members of the Maryland House of Delegates
Maryland lawyers